Ellgau is a municipality in the district of Augsburg in Bavaria, Germany.

References

Augsburg (district)